Reggae is an album by flautist Herbie Mann with the Tommy McCook Band recorded in London in 1973 and released on the Atlantic label.

Reception

The Allmusic site awarded the album 3 stars stating, inaccurately: "Despite its title, most of the music on this album is not actually reggae but a mixture of jazz, R&B and pop. Flutist Herbie Mann, guitarists Mick Taylor and Albert Lee and keyboardist Pat Rebillot combine with the eight-piece Tommy McCook band to create some spirited and danceable (if a bit dated) music... The results are fun if not all that substantial".

Track listing 
 "Ob-La-Di, Ob-La-Da" (John Lennon, Paul McCartney) - 7:44
 "Rivers of Babylon" (Brenton Dowe, Trevor McNaughton) - 4:42
 "Swinging Shepherd Blues" (Kenny Jacobson, Moe Koffman, Rhoda Roberts) - 8:19
 "My Girl" (Smokey Robinson, Ronald White) - 17:59

Personnel 
Herbie Mann - flute
Bobby Ellis - trumpet
Tommy McCook - tenor saxophone
Gladstone Anderson - piano
Winston Wright - organ
Pat Rebillot - piano, clavinet
Hux Brown, Rod Bryan, Albert Lee, Mick Taylor - guitar
Jackie Jackson - bass
Michael Richard - drums
Technical
Gary Martin - engineer
Ahmet Ertegun - executive producer
Don Brautigam - cover illustration

References 

Herbie Mann albums
1973 albums
Atlantic Records albums